Barbara Nielsen (born 21 September 1949), is a Dutch actress.

Filmography

References

External links
 

1949 births
Living people
Dutch film actresses
Dutch television actresses
20th-century Dutch actresses